Ancistrus occidentalis is a species of catfish in the family Loricariidae. It is native to South America, where it occurs in the Bobonaza River basin in Ecuador. The species reaches 8.6 cm (3.4 inches) SL.

References 

Fish described in 1904
occidentalis
Fauna of Ecuador
Taxa named by Charles Tate Regan